A floating shelf is a form of shelf with its wall fixings hidden within the shelf board, with no visible supporting brackets.

Description 
A floating shelf is a form of shelf with its wall fixings hidden within the shelf board, with no visible supporting brackets. It can be supported on hidden rods or bars that have been attached to studs. A thick floating shelf may be made of a hollow-core shelf glued to a cleat. A floating shelf may have two or more channels open from the back towards, but without reaching, the front, into which slide fasteners attached to the wall, typically held in place by screws inserted through the bottom of the shelf.

Use 
Floating shelves are a good fit for a contemporary minimalist style interior. They can be used to expand storage space, atop a radiator to double as storage, or inside a hallway to double as a console table.

Supports 
A supplier of typical floating shelf supports (though other options are available) suggests that floating brackets with a diameter of 12mm can support a shelf at least 22mm thick loaded with 20kg, and 18mm brackets can support 30kg on a 28mm shelf. There are also corner shelves, which may use different supports to make them "float".

References 

Furniture